Ardian "Ardi" Behari (born 12 March 1973) is a former Albanian football player.

Club career
He last played for Flamurtari Vlore in the Albanian Superliga.

International career
He was also part of the Albania National Team in 1996 and he earned 1 cap in a friendly against Bosnia and Herzegovina in Zenica in April 1996.

He is now coach of Flamurtari Vlore youth team and was put in charge of the first team in April 2018 to see out the remainder of the 2017-18 season.

Personal life
In October 2016, Behari was arrested for his involvement in a car accident which took the life of a 74-year old.

References

External links
 

1973 births
Living people
Albanian footballers
Association football defenders
Albania international footballers
Flamurtari Vlorë players
KF Tirana players
FK Partizani Tirana players
Albanian football managers
Flamurtari Vlorë managers